Blindsight is a 2006 documentary film directed by Lucy Walker and produced by Sybil Robson Orr for Robson Entertainment. It premiered at 2006 Toronto International Film Festival (TIFF) in the category Real to Reel.

Summary
Blindsight follows six Tibetan teenagers on their journey to climb the 23,000 foot Lhakpa Ri mountain in the shadow of Mount Everest, a challenge made all the more remarkable by the fact that the teenagers are blind. The children are at times feared by their parents, scorned by villagers and deemed sinners by devout followers of Buddhism, and believed to be cursed. Helped by Sabriye Tenberken — a blind German social worker who established the first school for the blind in Lhasa — the students invite the famous blind mountain climber Erik Weihenmayer to visit their school after learning about his climb to the summit of Everest. Erik arrives in Lhasa and helps the students and their educators climb higher than they have ever been before.

Critical reception
The film received near universally positive reviews from critics. The review aggregator website Rotten Tomatoes reported that 98% of critics gave the film a positive review, based on 49 reviews. Metacritic reported the film had an average score of 72 out of 100, based on 12 reviews.

Awards and nominations
WINNER - Audience Award for Best film Berlin Film Festival Panorama 2007
WINNER – Audience Award for best documentary film American Film Institute - AFI - (see American Film Institute Awards 2006) Los Angeles
WINNER - Audience Award for Best Documentary Palm Springs Film Festival
 NOMINEE – Best Documentary British Independent Film Awards 2006

References

External links

2006 films
Documentary films about Tibet
Tibetan-language films
2006 documentary films
Mountaineering films
Documentary films about children with disability
Documentary films about blind people
Documentary films about climbing
Documentary films about sportspeople with disability
Films directed by Lucy Walker
2000s English-language films
British sports documentary films
2000s British films